"Douglas" Khoo Kok Hui (born 21 May 1965 in Kuala Lumpur) is a Malaysian racing driver currently competing in the TCR International Series. He had previously competed in the Asia Classic Car Challenge.

Racing career
Khoo began his career in 2014 in the Asia Classic Car Challenge, he finished 2nd in the championship standings that year.

In October 2015 it was announced that he would race in the TCR Asia Series & TCR International Series, driving a SEAT León Cup Racer for Niza Racing.

2016 saw him finish the year 1st Runner Up in the Amateur Driver's Championship and 7th in the Overall Driver's Championship.

Khoo participated in the 2016 Sepang 12 Hours race and was Champion in the Touring Car Category.

Racing record

Complete TCR International Series results
(key) (Races in bold indicate pole position) (Races in italics indicate fastest lap)

† Driver did not finish the race, but was classified as he completed over 90% of the race distance.
* Season still in progress.

TCR Spa 500 results

References

External links
 

1965 births
Living people
Malaysian people of Chinese descent
Sportspeople from Kuala Lumpur
TCR Asia Series drivers
TCR International Series drivers
Malaysian racing drivers
Asian Le Mans Series drivers
Le Mans Cup drivers
Craft-Bamboo Racing drivers